Phenylsulfinic acid is an organosulfur compound with the formula C6H5SO2H. It is a colorless or white crystalline solid that is usually stored in the form of its sodium salt. In aqueous solution it is strongly acidic and is easily oxidized in air. Phenylsulfinic acid and its esters are chiral.

Acidity
There is a large range of pKa values in the literature, with most authors giving a value of around 1.30. This inconsistency can be explained by differences in ionic strength between quoted values. By measuring the pKa at various ionic strengths and extrapolating to zero ionic strength, the pKa of phenylsulfinic acid was determined to be 2.76. This makes phenylsulfinic acid a stronger acid than its corresponding carboxylic acid, benzoic acid (pKa = 4.2), but weaker than its corresponding sulfonic acid, benzenesulfonic acid (pKa = −6.5).

Preparation
Phenylsulfinic acid can be  prepared in several ways, most easily through reduction of sulfonyl chlorides with zinc dust or iron. However other starting materials can be used. Due to the air sensitivity of this compound it is often formed as a salt.
2 C6H5SO2Cl + 2 Zn  →  (C6H5SO2)2Zn + ZnCl2
(C6H5SO2)2Zn + Na2CO3 → 2 C6H5SO2Na + ZnCO3

A convenient method is the reduction of the sulfonyl chloride or sulfonyl fluoride with sodium sulfite, producing the acid instead of a salt:
C6H5SO2Cl  +  Na2SO3  +  H2O   →  C6H5SO2H  +  NaCl + NaHSO4

Many other methods have been reported for production of sulfinic acids such as the use tin(II) chloride, or the Grignard reagent with sulfur dioxide. The preparation of sulfinic acids by the oxidation of thiols is difficult due to overoxidation.

Properties
In sulfinic acids, sulfur has the +4 oxidation state. They are prone to oxidation to sulphonic acids as well as reduction via sulphenic acids (+2) to thiols.

Sulphinic acid derivatives disproportionate in the presence of acid:
2 PhSO2H   →   PhSO2SOPh + H2O
PhSO2SOPh   →   PhSO2• + PhSO → PhSO3SPh
PhSO3SPh  +  PhSO2H   →   PhSO3H + PhSO2SPh

When phenylsulfinic acid reacts with sulfur to give thiosulfinates and thiosulfinic acids.

Use
The main use of phenylsulfinic acid is for the asymmetric synthesis of carbon-carbon bonds due to its ability to stabilize negative charges on an adjacent carbon atom. Phenylsulfinic acid has been a component for electroplating of palladium alloys.

References 

Sulfinic acids
Phenyl compounds